Bouteloua eludens, colloquially known as Santa Rita grama or sometimes Santa Rita Mountain grama, is a grass species in the grama genus native to southern Arizona in the United States and northern Sonora in Mexico.

Description
The base of the plant is rhizome like. Inflorescences are borne in groups of 8 to 18.

Distribution
It is known to live in the Santa Rita Mountains (from which it takes its name), the Santa Catalina Mountains, Nogales, and parts of Sonora. It is a fairly rare species across its range.

References

eludens
Grasses of North America
Grasses of Mexico
Grasses of the United States
Drought-tolerant plants
Warm-season grasses of North America